Free Agents is a romantic black comedy starring Stephen Mangan, Sharon Horgan and Anthony Head. Originally a pilot for Channel 4 in November 2007, the series began on 13 February 2009. It spawned a short lived US remake, which was cancelled after just 4 episodes aired, although 4 more were later released on Hulu.

Plot
Alex Taylor (Mangan) works for CMA, a successful talent agency. Whilst he is grateful for his job, he is currently going through a messy divorce, causing him to become depressed. His boss however, Stephen Cauldwell (Head), is sex-obsessed, cocksure and roguish. Alex later meets Helen Ryan (Horgan), a co-worker who is more successful and herself recovering from a messy relationship, after her boyfriend died months before her wedding.

Production
The series is produced by Big Talk Productions and Bwark Productions and is written by Chris Niel. It was formed as part of Channel 4's 2007 Comedy Showcase along with Plus One and The Kevin Bishop Show, both of which were given their own series. The show was originally entitled Bitter and Twisted. The series started on 13 February and ended on 20 March. Shortly before the final episode aired, Mangan told a reporter that he and the rest of the cast were hoping to make a second series.

Episodes

Reception
The pilot attracted positive reviews. David Chater in The Times said, "There is a good deal of snappy banter between the two (Mangan and Horgan), but Anthony Head as their boss steals the show as a pervy old goat out of whose mouth pours an unending stream of uncensored filth. It’s like being confronted by an erection on screen – more amazing than shocking."

Gareth McLean in The Guardian said, "There's little funnier than other people's emotional damage and the consequent mess they make of things, so Chris Niel's tale of two colleagues - he an estranged dad, she lately availed of a dead fiance - who have casual sex and have to deal with the aftermath is very funny indeed."

When the series was first broadcast, the Sunday Express attacked the show because of bad language, claiming that the word "cunt" was used three times and "fuck" 22 times. John Beyer from Mediawatch said, "The obscene language in this programme is appalling by any standard. It shows a disregard of public concern that is completely unacceptable from a public service broadcaster."

International broadcasts

References

External links

2000s British sitcoms
2009 British television series debuts
2009 British television series endings
Television series by Big Talk Productions
Channel 4 sitcoms
Comedy Showcase
English-language television shows
Television series by ITV Studios
Television series by Banijay